Macquarie Law School (Macquarie Law or MQ Law) is the law school of Macquarie University and was first established in 1972 as Sydney's third law school. Established as a foundational discipline of the University in the 1970s, Macquarie Law School is one of Australia’s premier law schools. 

Entry into the law school is competitive, with candidates required to possess superior grades including an ATAR of 96, or have gained an internal GPA of at least 3.0 for competitive first-year application.  Macquarie Law School is ranked 8th in the country, according to the QS Rankings by subject 2023. 

In 2010, in line with modernising practice of the University, the typical undergraduate law degree offered a new curriculum with inclusion of the new "people and planet" units, with new law reform units which students may wish to undertake as part of their degree.

Macquarie Law School aims to equip students with more than traditional skills, but more so practical skills to enter the legal profession with ease at the completion of a degree.  Staff at Macquarie Law School are also active in matters of pro-bono legal work, and other various matters on domestic and international fronts.

Dean of Macquarie Law School
The current Dean of Law is Professor Lise Barry.

Location
The Law School is currently located in Building W3A on the main campus.  A new Law School building, to open in 2023, will be named the Michael Kirby Building.

Centres
Centre for Environmental Law:
The University has a strong history of involvement in environmental studies and the Centre for Environmental Law was one of Australia's first. It has been formally recognised as a Centre of Excellence within the University. The centre focuses on research and cases of law concerned with international, comparative and national environmental law, climate change, biodiversity, marine law and oceans governance, planning and local government law, pollution law, corporate environmental law, Indigenous peoples and environmental rights, heritage law and policy, trade and environment, and environmental litigation and mediation. 
MU-CEL is a member of the International Union for Conservation of Nature (IUCN) and Macquarie University, is a founding member of the IUCN's Academy of Environmental Law.

Publications

 Macquarie Law Journal
The Macquarie Law Journal is the initiative of the Department of Law at Macquarie University. It is published annually, both in hard copy and online, each volume having a special theme.
Manuscripts are refereed by means of double-blind, peer review.
 Australian Journal of Legal History 
The Australian Journal of Legal History is dedicated to publishing high quality research by those scholars from different disciplinary backgrounds who are interested in the dynamic relationship between law and history. The bi-annual journal, which was previously produced at the University of Adelaide, builds upon the research and teaching strengths in legal history at Macquarie University.
 Macquarie Journal of International and Comparative Environmental Law 
The Macquarie Journal of International and Comparative Environmental Law provides a forum for scholarly dialogue concerning both global and regional environmental issues. The biannual Journal contains a variety of articles and book reviews together with relevant case and legislative commentary.  The editorial board is made up of 12 distinguished experts in the field of international environmental law from 11 different countries.

Macquarie University Law Society
Macquarie University Law Society (MULS) was founded in 1975 and is the representative body for all law students at Macquarie University. Elections are held annually to elect different members into the executive. The society offers a range of events of both strict legal and casual social nature as well as engage students to participate in various events such as mooting and mock trials.

MULS is also the main developer of the publication The Brief where articles by students, staff and legal professionals are included. The first section of The Brief contains student-written articles, interviews and pieces by prominent academics and professionals;  the second section contains reports on events at MULS.

See also
Category:Macquarie Law School alumni

References

External links
Macquarie Law School Website

Macquarie University
Law schools in Australia